Morpheus Media Ventures is a multi-level entertainment company from Calcutta, India. Its corporate offices are located in Mumbai. Morpheus started its film production channel in 2006 with a Bengali movie and followed by Arin Paul's 10:10 . They attempt to do 3-4 movies per year in this language. They also started to produce Bollywood, Marathi movies as well as international movies. Its first international production is Nair San, which is being produced in three different languages.

Production

Notes

External links
10:10 Official Website
Morpheus Media Ventures

Bengali film producers
Film production companies based in Mumbai
Indian companies established in 2006
Mass media companies established in 2006
2006 establishments in Maharashtra